Parkville is a small township in the Hunter Region of New South Wales, Australia, located on the New England Highway and Main North railway line. At the 2006 census, Parkville had a population of 721 people.

A now closed railway station which opened in 1877 was located there, no trace now remains.

References

External links

Suburbs of Upper Hunter Shire
Towns in the Hunter Region
Main North railway line, New South Wales